Qaheran (also Romanized as Qāherān and Qāharān; also known as Kaharān and Kakharan) is a village in Zanjanrud-e Pain Rural District, Zanjanrud District, Zanjan County, Zanjan Province, Iran. At the 2006 census, its population was 267, in 70 families.

References 

Populated places in Zanjan County